Flora Redoumi (born 11 September 1976) is a Greek hurdler and she was born in Athens.

She finished fifth at the 2002 European Indoor Championships, seventh at the 2004 IAAF World Indoor Championships and seventh at the 2006 IAAF World Cup.

Her personal best time is 12,86 seconds, which ranks her second among Greek 100 m hurdlers of all time, only behind Paraskevi Patoulidou (12.64).

Competition record

Personal bests

References

External links
 

1976 births
Living people
Athletes (track and field) at the 2004 Summer Olympics
Athletes (track and field) at the 2008 Summer Olympics
Olympic athletes of Greece
Greek female hurdlers
Athletes from Athens
Mediterranean Games bronze medalists for Greece
Mediterranean Games medalists in athletics
Athletes (track and field) at the 2001 Mediterranean Games
Athletes (track and field) at the 2005 Mediterranean Games